Sheetal Amte (26 January 1981 – 30 November 2020), also known by the name Sheetal Amte-Karajgi after her marriage, was an Indian public health expert, disability specialist and social entrepreneur. She was chief executive officer and board member of a non-profit organisation, Maharogi Sewa Samiti, which focuses on helping people disadvantaged by leprosy.

Life 
Sheetal Amte was the daughter of Vikas Amte and Bharati Amte, and granddaughter of Baba Amte, who established a rehabilitation home for lepers in Anandwan, in the state of Maharashtra, and stayed there in campus. Maharogi Sewa Samiti has helped to create livelihood capacities of thousands of marginalised people especially those with disabilities like suffering with leprosy, Orthopedically handicapped, vision and hearing impaired and primitive tribal populace even operating from one of the most backward districts of Central India -Chandrapur since 1949.

She studied medicine and became a physician and also completed a master's degree in social entrepreneurship from Tata Institute of Social Sciences (TISS), and joined her family working at Anandwan to continue her grandfather's vision; her brother Kaustubh is an accountant for Anandwan and her uncle Prakash Amte and aunt Mandakini Amte are also physicians at the community. She also studied leadership from the Harvard Kennedy School.

She helped to secure the financial assistance of the Tech Mahindra Foundation to provide food for children in Anandwan schools. She also led the installation of solar power panels at the community, resulting in Maharogi Sewa Samiti receiving an award for Innovative Energy Project of the Year 2016 from the Association of Energy Engineers, and intended to incorporate more smart technology into the community in future to make Anandwan a smart village.

In 2016, she was named a Young Global Leader by the World Economic Forum. She was also selected as Member of World Economic Forum Expert Network on Humanitarian Response. She was also selected as a United Nations Innovation Ambassador and an advisor to i4P (Innovations for Peace). Dr.Sheetal was working as a fellow of the World Innovation Organisation, an initiative from World Summit on Innovation and United Nations. In the year 2016 she was awarded INK fellowship and Rotary Vocational Excellence Award.

On 30 November 2020, she died by suicide. She was also a painter and is survived by her husband Gautam Karajgi and a seven-year-old son Sharvil.

References

1981 births
2020 deaths
2020 suicides
21st-century Indian medical doctors
Indian women medical doctors
21st-century Indian women scientists
21st-century women physicians
Medical doctors from Maharashtra
People from Chandrapur district
Suicides in India